Thatcher David Szalay (born January 18, 1979) is an American football player of Hungarian origin who has previously played for the NFL on the Baltimore Ravens, Seattle Seahawks, and the Bengals.  He is now a math teacher at Florence Carlton Middle School in Florence, Montana.

1979 births
American football centers
American football offensive guards
Baltimore Ravens players
Living people
People from Kalispell, Montana
Montana Grizzlies football players
American people of Hungarian descent